You Are Happy is a 1974 collection of poems by Canadian writer Margaret Atwood.

Contents
The book contains the following poems:

You Are Happy
Newsreel: man and firing squad
Useless
Memory
Chaos poem
Gothic letter on a hot night
November
Repent
Digging
How
Spring poem
Tricks with mirrors
You are happy

Songs of the transformed
Pig song
Bull song
Rat song
Crow song
Song of the worms
Owl song
Siren song
Song of the fox
Song of the hen's head
Corpse song

Circe or Mud Poems
First prayer
Is/not
four evasions

There is only one of everything
Eating fire
Four auguries
Head against white
There is only one of everything
Late August
Book of ancestors

Reception
A poetry review in The New York Times called "Songs of the transformed" "a splendid series of animal poems ... [able] to capture the natural world and yet to manage to make a larger statement.", and Manijeh Mannani of Athabasca University found that it "continue[s] the same thread of feminist concerns [of her previous poetry] with only the concluding poems of the collection reflecting the optimistic connotation inherent in the title."

You Are Happy has also been discussed by Poetry.

Further reading

References

External links
Library holdings of You Are Happy

1974 poetry books
Poetry by Margaret Atwood
Canadian poetry collections
Oxford University Press books